Reva is a village in Ancuabe District in Cabo Delgado Province in northeastern Mozambique.

Geography
Reva is located northeast of the district capital of Ancuabe and southwest of the town of Muangide.

Transport

The nearest airport is } away at Pemba Airport. Mueda Airport is } away.

References

External links  
 Satellite map at Maplandia.com

Populated places in Ancuabe District